Khoshk Rud or Khoshk-e Rud or Khoshkrud or Khoshkerud (Persian: خشكرود) may refer to:

 Khoshk Rud, Ardabil
 Khoshk Rud, Gilan
 Khoshk Rud, Isfahan
 Khoshk Rud, Kerman
 Khoshk Rud, Lorestan
 Khoshkrud, Markazi
 Khoshk Rud, Amol, Mazandaran Province
 Khoshk Rud, Babolsar, Mazandaran Province
 Khoshkrud, Tonekabon, Mazandaran Province
 Khoshkrud, Khorramabad, Tonekabon County, Mazandaran Province
 Khoshkrud, Zanjan
 Khoshkrud Rural District (Markazi Province)
 Khoshk Rud Rural District (Mazandaran Province)

See also
 Khoshkeh Rud (disambiguation)